Sergei Vladimirovich Panov (born 13 July 1989) is a Russian former football goalkeeper.

Club career
He made his debut in the Russian Second Division for FC Vityaz Podolsk on 8 July 2011 in a game against FC Gubkin.

He made his Russian Football National League debut for FC Dynamo Saint Petersburg on 6 July 2014 in a game against FC Tom Tomsk.

References

External links
 

1989 births
Living people
Russian footballers
Russia under-21 international footballers
FC Dynamo Moscow reserves players
FC Vityaz Podolsk players
FC Dynamo Saint Petersburg players
FC Sakhalin Yuzhno-Sakhalinsk players
Association football goalkeepers